Andrew Mewing (born 1981) is a former national-team swimmer from Australia. He is also a past Executive member of the Australian Swimmers Association.

He swam for Australia at:
Commonwealth Games: 2006,
World Championships: 2005, 2007
Pan Pacs: 2006
Short Course Worlds: 2004, 2006

He brought suit against Australia's national swimming federation, Swimming Australia in 2008, in an effort to get on Australia's 2008 Olympic team.

References

Living people
Australian male freestyle swimmers
World Aquatics Championships medalists in swimming
Medalists at the FINA World Swimming Championships (25 m)
Commonwealth Games medallists in swimming
Commonwealth Games bronze medallists for Australia
Universiade medalists in swimming
1981 births
Swimmers at the 2006 Commonwealth Games
Universiade bronze medalists for Australia
Medalists at the 2003 Summer Universiade
Medallists at the 2006 Commonwealth Games